The 189th Ohio Infantry Regiment, sometimes 189th Ohio Volunteer Infantry (or 189th OVI) was an infantry regiment in the Union Army during the American Civil War.

Service
The 189th Ohio Infantry was organized at Camp Chase in Columbus, Ohio, and mustered in for one year service on March 4, 1865, under the command of Colonel Henry Denison Kingsbury.

The regiment left Ohio for Huntsville, Alabama, March 7. It was attached to District of North Alabama, Department of the Tennessee, to September 1865.  Arrived at Huntsville, March 17, 1865. Assigned to duty along Memphis & Charleston Railroad guarding bridges and building stockades until June. The regiment concentrated June 20 and was assigned to post duty at Huntsville until September 25.

The 189th Ohio Infantry mustered out of service September 28, 1865, at Nashville, Tennessee.

Casualties
The regiment lost a total of 49 enlisted men during service; 1 man killed, 48 due to disease.

Commanders
 Colonel Henry Denison Kingsbury

Notable members
 Captain Andrew J. Applegate, Company H - first lieutenant governor of Alabama, 1868-1870

See also

 List of Ohio Civil War units
 Ohio in the Civil War

References
 Dyer, Frederick H. A Compendium of the War of the Rebellion (Des Moines, IA:  Dyer Pub. Co.), 1908.
 Ohio Roster Commission. Official Roster of the Soldiers of the State of Ohio in the War on the Rebellion, 1861–1865, Compiled Under the Direction of the Roster Commission (Akron, OH: Werner Co.), 1886–1895.
 Reid, Whitelaw. Ohio in the War: Her Statesmen, Her Generals, and Soldiers (Cincinnati, OH: Moore, Wilstach, & Baldwin), 1868. 
Attribution

External links
 Ohio in the Civil War: 189th Ohio Volunteer Infantry by Larry Stevens
 National flag of the 189th Ohio Infantry
 Regimental flag of the 189th Ohio Infantry

Military units and formations established in 1865
Military units and formations disestablished in 1865
Units and formations of the Union Army from Ohio
1865 establishments in Ohio